Metrannus was the Patrician of Provence around the year 700, when he appeared in control of Marseille according to the Passio Leudegarii.

Sources
Lewis, Archibald R. "The Dukes in the Regnum Francorum, A.D. 550-751." Speculum, Vol. 51, No 3 (July 1976), pp 381–410.

8th-century deaths
Year of birth unknown
8th-century Frankish nobility